Alliance is a city and the county seat of Box Butte County, in the western part of the state of Nebraska, in the Great Plains region of the United States. Its population was 8,151 at the 2020 census.

Alliance is the home to Carhenge, a replica of Stonehenge constructed with automobiles, which is located north of the city. It is also the location of Alliance Municipal Airport, the least-used airport in the mainland United States.

History
The town was originally named Grand Lake. When the Chicago, Burlington and Quincy Railroad came to Grand Lake in 1888, the railroad superintendent, G.W. Holdrege, wanted to change it to a simple one-word name closer to the beginning of the alphabet, which he thought would be better for business. The U.S. Post Office gave Holdrege permission, and he picked "Alliance" for the new name of the town. Alliance was incorporated as a city in 1891.

The Alliance Army Airfield was established in 1942. Construction was completed in August 1943 and the Army Air Corps used the facility as a training base until the end of World War II. The facility was transferred from the federal government to the City of Alliance in 1953 and is currently in use as the Alliance Municipal Airport.

Geography
Alliance is located at the western edge of Nebraska's Sand Hills.

Climate
Located in the High Plains, Alliance's climate is rather typical of the surrounding region. Under the Köppen climate classification, the town features a BSk climate, commonly described as a "Cold Steppe", with winters just below the  threshold needed to be classified as a Continental climate, if it had enough precipitation to not be arid or semi-arid.

Precipitation is significantly higher in summer than in winter, with the wettest month being June, and the driest month being January.

Demographics

2010 census
As of the census of 2010, there were 8,491 people, 3,559 households, and 2,276 families living in the city. The racial makeup of the city was 87.5% White, 0.5% African American, 4.6% Native American, 0.3% Asian, 4.2% from other races, and 2.9% from two or more races. Hispanic or Latino of any race were 12.3% of the population.

There were 3,559 households, of which 31.0% had children under the age of 18 living with them, 50.3% were married couples living together, 9.8% had a female householder with no husband present, 3.8% had a male householder with no wife present, and 36.0% were non-families. 32.4% of all households were made up of individuals, and 12.8% had someone living alone who was 65 years of age or older. The average household size was 2.34 and the average family size was 2.96.

The median age in the city was 39.8 years. 25.8% of residents were under the age of 18; 6.9% were between the ages of 18 and 24; 23.2% were from 25 to 44; 29.2% were from 45 to 64; and 14.9% were 65 years of age or older. The gender makeup of the city was 48.4% male and 51.6% female.

2000 census
As of the census of 2000, there were 8,959 people, 3,565 households, and 2,392 families living in the city. The population density was 1,879.1 people per square mile (725.2/km). There were 4,062 housing units at an average density of 852.0 per square mile (328.8/km). The racial makeup of the city was 89.09% White, 0.49% African American, 3.40% Native American, 0.60% Asian, 0.01% Pacific Islander, 4.31% from other races, and 2.09% from two or more races. Hispanic or Latino of any race were 8.94% of the population.

There were 3,565 households, out of which 36.0% had children under the age of 18 living with them, 54.8% were married couples living together, 9.4% had a female householder with no husband present, and 32.9% were non-families. 29.5% of all households were made up of individuals, and 11.7% had someone living alone who was 65 years of age or older. The average household size was 2.46 and the average family size was 3.06.

In the city, the population was spread out, with 28.1% under the age of 18, 8.0% from 18 to 24, 27.1% from 25 to 44, 22.4% from 45 to 64, and 14.4% who were 65 years of age or older. The median age was 37 years. For every 100 females, there were 96.2 males. For every 100 females age 18 and over, there were 91.8 males.

As of 2000 the median income for a household in the city was $39,408, and the median income for a family was $47,766. Males had a median income of $39,122 versus $22,561 for females. The per capita income for the city was $18,584. About 10.6% of families and 11.2% of the population were below the poverty line, including 15.1% of those under age 18 and 9.9% of those age 65 or over.

Education
Alliance Public Schools operates five schools: Early Childhood Center (birth to age 5), Emerson Elementary (kindergarten through grade 2), Grandview Elementary (grades 3–5), Alliance Middle School (grades 6–8), and Alliance High School (grades 9–12).

St. Agnes Academy is the local parochial school, in association with Holy Rosary and St. Bridget Catholic Churches. St. Agnes is located within a historic building designed by noted architect William L. Steele.

Transportation

Airport
Alliance is served by the Alliance Municipal Airport, three miles southeast of the city, which it owns. In the 12 months ending in January 2021, the airport received 2,882 passengers, or an average of just 8 per day, making it the least-used airport in the mainland United States.

Railway
The BNSF railway line from the northern exit of the Powder River Basin, one of the largest coal-mining areas of the world, to Alliance and the eastern United States, sees a rather large number of coal trains every day, to power plants in the Midwest and South. In the southern areas of Alliance there is a large train yard which hosts many of these coal trains.

Tourism
Among the city's attractions is Carhenge, an assemblage of thirty-eight vehicles built in the model of Stonehenge by Jim Reinders and thirty-five family members in the summer of 1987. The sculpture was constructed on the farm of Reinders's late father just north of Alliance. Other works have been built in the surrounding area of the sculpture.

Additionally, during August 2017, a total solar eclipse moved directly over the city, making it one of the best cities in Nebraska to see it, along with Grand Island and Falls City.

Notable people 

 Jimmy Abegg, visual artist, member of Rich Mullins' A Ragamuffin Band and Vector
 Moon Bloodgood, actress/model, born in Alliance
 David Bunnell, publisher, writer 
 Helen Duhamel, businesswoman and broadcaster, attended St. Agnes Academy in Alliance
 James Emanuel, poet and critic
 Jordan Hooper, basketball player for WNBA's Chicago Sky; born in Alliance
 LeRoy J. Louden, Nebraska legislator
 Luke Redfield, singer/songwriter, spent a portion of his youth in Alliance
 Peary Rader, American bodybuilder and magazine publisher from Nebraska. He was the founding publisher of Iron Man from 1936 to 1986. Died in Alliance.

In fiction
The second half of Ann Patchett's 1997 novel The Magician's Assistant is set entirely in Alliance.

References

External links

 City of Alliance
 Alliance Chamber of Commerce
 Alliance Times-Herald newspaper
 

Cities in Box Butte County, Nebraska
Cities in Nebraska
County seats in Nebraska